Worrisome Heart is the debut studio album by American singer and songwriter Melody Gardot. It was released independently in 2006 and later re-released in 2007 and 2008 by Verve Records in the United States and by Universal Classics and Jazz (UCJ) internationally. The album contains new recordings of songs previously released on Gardot's first extended play, Some Lessons: The Bedroom Sessions (2005), as well as previously unreleased tracks.

Background
Speaking of how the album first came to be made, Gardot told British writer Pete Lewis of Blues & Soul in November 2008: "It was created independently of a record company. It was made privately. So my only intention, or my only , was to make a record that at the end of the day I was happy with. And the way that the instrumentation was decided on was based on what I heard in my head, and what I thought would  the best. So I guess having it released is kinda like having somebody publish your diary in a way!"

The tracks "Wicked Ride", "Some Lessons" and "Goodnite" were re-recorded for this album and are not the versions that appear on the Some Lessons: The Bedroom Sessions EP. The 2006 independent release has a longer running time of 41:40 as it included the new version of "Wicked Ride", as well as the hidden track "Sorry State", which were omitted when released by Verve Records. The album cover and track listing were changed for a promotional release in 2007 and again for its eventual official release under the label in 2008.

Reception
JazzTimes review by A. D. Amorosi stated, "But, though she plays so very well with others, if she was alone on a street corner, hooting to the moon, you’d hear the same subtle drama and dynamics. Forget the story. Desire the singer." Michael G. Nastos of AllMusic wrote, "Melody Gardot's debut recording, released in 2006, came two years after she suffered a near fatal automobile accident, the differently able Gardot triumphing in accomplishing what many others, including her, could only dream of. This project has her singing and playing guitar and a little piano, but more so presenting this project of all original material. Gardot has an interesting personal story, but even more intriguing music that straddles the line between lounge jazz, folk, and cowgirl songs." Geoffrey Himes of Washington Post added, "Melancholy or irreverent, Gardot's vocals fit snugly into the understated jazz arrangements. But what really sells these songs are the juicy melodies. If the chorus hook of her "Sweet Memory" reminds one of Carole King's "Sweet Seasons," that's just a measure of the high standard she meets on all of her originals."

Track listing

Personnel

 Melody Gardot –  vocals, guitar, piano, vox organ, producer
 Joel Bryant – Fender Rhodes, Hammond organ, Wurlitzer
 Ron Kerber – clarinet, tenor saxophone
 Matt Cappy – trumpet
 Patrick Hughes – trumpet
 Stan Slotter – trumpet
 Jef Lee Johnson – guitar
 Barney McKenna – guitar
 Mike Brenner – lap steel guitar
 Kurt Johnston – dobro
 David Mowry – dobro
 Paul Klinefelter – bass
 Ken Pendergast – bass
 Diane Monroe – violin
 Charlie Patierno – drums, percussion
Technical
 Glenn Barratt – engineer, mixing, producer
 Dave Gerhart – engineer
 Bernie Grundman – mastering

Credits adapted from AllMusic.

Charts

Weekly charts

Year-end charts

Certifications

References

External links

2006 debut albums
Melody Gardot albums
Universal Classics and Jazz albums
Verve Records albums